John Scott (born Patrick John O'Hara Scott, 1 November 1930), also known as Johnny Scott and Patrick John Scott, is an English film composer and music conductor. Scott has collaborated with well-known directors and producers, including Mark Damon, Richard Donner, Charlton Heston, Mike Hodges, Hugh Hudson, Norman Jewison, Irvin Kershner, Ilaiyaraaja, Daniel Petrie, Roger Spottiswoode, and Norman J. Warren.

Life and career
Scott was born in Bishopston, Bristol, England. His father, a musician in the Bristol Police Band, gave him his first music lessons. At the age of 14, he enrolled in the British Army (in the Royal Artillery Band, Woolwich) as a Boy Musician in order to continue his musical studies of the clarinet, harp and saxophone.

Later, Scott toured with some of the best-known British bands of the era. He was hired by EMI to arrange and conduct some of its most popular artists and, during this time, worked with Beatles producer George Martin (playing flute in the band's 1965 recording "You've Got To Hide Your Love Away"). Scott also recorded such artists as Tom Jones, Cilla Black, and The Hollies. As a musician, he played with The Julian Bream Consort, John Dankworth, Cleo Laine, Yehudi Menuhin, Nelson Riddle and Ravi Shankar.

Credited as Johnny Scott, and playing flute, he led a jazz quintet, quartet and trio during the 1960s. He played for Henry Mancini and was principal saxophonist in John Barry's soundtrack to the James Bond film Goldfinger (1964).

Since the 1960s, Scott has composed for more than 100 film and television productions. Some of Scott's most praised and recognized scores are Antony and Cleopatra (1972), England Made Me (1973), North Dallas Forty (1979), The Final Countdown (1980), Greystoke: The Legend of Tarzan, Lord of the Apes (1984) and The Shooting Party (1985). His TV work includes the themes to the BBC current affairs programmes Nationwide and Midweek, incidental music for the ITV series Rosemary and Thyme, and documentaries by French explorer Jacques Cousteau. He also composed the instrumental piece "Gathering Crowds" for a stock music library. While the opening bars of the piece were used briefly in 1976 by ABC for its nightly national news program, the piece would later become iconic in the US for its use as the closing theme for the long-running syndicated Major League Baseball highlights show This Week in Baseball.

Scott is also active as a classical composer (having written a symphony, a ballet, four string quartets and a guitar concerto) and as a conductor. Orchestras that he has conducted include the London Philharmonic Orchestra, the London Symphony Orchestra, the Royal Philharmonic Orchestra, the Munich Symphony Orchestra, the Berlin Radio Symphony Orchestra, the Budapest Opera Orchestra, the Lubliana Radio Orchestra and the Prague Philharmonic.

In 2006–2008, Scott served as the artistic director of the Hollywood Symphony Orchestra.

On 16 October 2013 Scott was presented with a BASCA Gold Badge Award in recognition of his contribution to music.

Selected filmography

A Study in Terror (1965)
Doctor in Clover (1966)
Stranger in the House (1967)
The Long Duel (1967)
Jules Verne's Rocket to the Moon (1967)
Berserk! (1967)
The Violent Enemy (1968)
Amsterdam Affair (1968)
Her Private Hell (1968)
Loving Feeling (1969)
Crooks and Coronets (1969)
Twinky (1969)
Trog (1970)
Girl Stroke Boy (1971)
Wake in Fright (1971)
Antony and Cleopatra (1972)
Doomwatch (1972)
The Jerusalem File (1972)
Mark of the Devil Part II (1973)
England Made Me (1973)
Penny Gold (1973)
Billy Two Hats (1974)
Craze (1974)
Symptoms (1974)
Hennessy (1975)
That Lucky Touch (1975)
Satan's Slave (1976)
The People That Time Forgot (1977)
North Dallas Forty (1979)
The Hostage Tower (1980)
The Final Countdown (1980)
Inseminoid (1981)
Yor, the Hunter from the Future (1983)
Greystoke: The Legend of Tarzan, Lord of the Apes (1984)
The Shooting Party (1985)
The Whistle Blower (1986)
King Kong Lives (1986)
The Clan of the Cave Bear (1986) (rejected)
Man on Fire (1987)
A Prayer for the Dying (1987) (rejected)
White Water Summer (1987) (rejected)
Shoot to Kill (1988)
The Deceivers (1988)
Winter People (1989)
Black Rainbow (1989)
King of the Wind (1990)
Lionheart (1990)
Ruby (1992)
Far from Home: The Adventures of Yellow Dog (1995)
The Second Jungle Book: Mowgli & Baloo (1997) 
The New Swiss Family Robinson (1998)
Time of the Wolf (2002)
The Wicker Tree (2011)

References

External links
 
 Official website (archived)

1930 births
20th-century classical composers
20th-century British conductors (music)
20th-century English composers
21st-century classical composers
21st-century British conductors (music)
21st-century English composers
English male classical composers
English clarinetists
English conductors (music)
British male conductors (music)
English film score composers
English male film score composers
English flautists
English harpists
English jazz bandleaders
English jazz saxophonists
English classical saxophonists
British male saxophonists
English television composers
English male composers
Living people
Musicians from Bristol
20th-century saxophonists
21st-century saxophonists
21st-century clarinetists
20th-century British male musicians
21st-century British male musicians
British male jazz musicians
Varèse Sarabande Records artists
20th-century flautists
21st-century flautists